John Reside (19 August 1867 – 28 September 1902) was an Australian trade unionist and politician who was a Labor Party member of the Legislative Assembly of Western Australia from 1901 until his death, representing the seat of Hannans.

Reside was born in Bendigo, Victoria, to Nancy (née Carr) and William Reside. He attended the Bendigo School of Mines and qualified as a mine engine driver in 1888, afterward working at various mines in the local area. He also became involved in the labour movement, serving as a branch president of the Engine Driver's Union and as a member of Bendigo's trades and labour council. Reside moved to Kalgoorlie, Western Australia, in 1897, and helped to found  the Eastern Goldfields Trades and Labour Council, of which he later became president. Reside entered parliament at the 1901 state election, winning the newly created seat of Hannans. However, his time in parliament was short-lived, as he collapsed and died suddenly in September 1902, aged only 35. The cause of death was believed to be heart disease.

References

1867 births
1902 deaths
Australian Labor Party members of the Parliament of Western Australia
Australian trade unionists
Members of the Western Australian Legislative Assembly
People from Bendigo
19th-century Australian politicians